Aurotalis delicatalis is a moth in the family Crambidae. It was described by George Hampson in 1919. It is found in Malawi.

References

Endemic fauna of Malawi
Crambinae
Moths described in 1919
Moths of Africa